Ricardo Horacio Dillon (born 4 August 1964) is an Argentine football manager and former player who played as either a midfielder or a forward.

Managerial career 
Dillon started his managerial career with Independiente Rivadavia. In 2011, he was appointed head coach of Sportivo Desamparados in the Argentinean Primera B Nacional, a position he held until 2012. After that, he coached Juventud Alianza, Club Atlético Güemes, C.D. Olmedo, and Mushuc Runa S.C., where he currently coaches.

References

External links 
 

1964 births
Living people
Argentine footballers
Association football midfielders
San Martín de San Juan footballers
Argentine football managers
Argentine expatriate football managers
Expatriate football managers in Ecuador
C.D. Olmedo managers
Mushuc Runa S.C. managers
Independiente Rivadavia managers
Argentino de Mendoza players
Juventud Alianza players
Gimnasia y Esgrima de Mendoza footballers
Independiente Rivadavia footballers
San Martín de Mendoza footballers
Atlético Tucumán footballers
Godoy Cruz Antonio Tomba footballers